R. D. Rajpal public school is located in Dwarka, India. It is affiliated to CBSE up to Senior Secondary level and recognised by DOE. It is a coeducational school from Nursery to XII. The school offers Medical, Non-medical, Commerce and Humanities streams at Senior Secondary level. The school offers various indoor activities like chess, table tennis, carrom, etc and also offers outdoor activities like football, tennis, badminton, cricket.

External links
  Official website]
 Slideshow Video Website

Schools in West Delhi
Schools in Delhi